Joseph Edward Hitchen (born September 2, 1969) is a Canadian retired professional wrestler and trainer, known under his ring name Joe E. Legend. He also wrestled for the World Wrestling Federation (WWF) from 2000 to 2001 under the ring name Just Joe.

Professional wrestling career

Early career (1992–1997)
Joe Legend began wrestling in Canada before becoming a part of the successful tag team Sex and Violence with Sexton Hardcastle in the Detroit area. His debut match was against Zakk Wyld (Keith Assoun) in Brampton. Ontario in 1992. During 1997, Sex and Violence were a part of a bigger gang which was known as THUG Life, which was composed of Legend, Hardcastle, Christian Cage, Zakk Wyld, Bloody Bill Skullion and Rhino Richards. Among his catchphrases used was "Heroes come and heroes go, but legends live forever!"

Touring Europe (1998–present)
Hitchen later competed under XL Legend in the Catch Wrestling Association which is based in Germany. He later teamed with Rhino Richards to win the vacant World Tag Team Championships by defeating Rico de Cuba and August Smisl on October 10, 1998, in Hanover, Germany. The title was vacated in October 1998 when Rhino Richards left the promotion after signing with Extreme Championship Wrestling. After his departure from the WWF in the spring of 2001, Legend found success in Germany and England.

In April 2005, he was one of the lead trainers of Celebrity Wrestling in the United Kingdom on ITV. This Saturday evening reality show saw celebrities learn wrestling and compete in challenge matches. After a few weeks the program was set to be cancelled, but instead was moved to Sunday morning to finish its final episodes.

He can now be found wrestling in and around the United Kingdom for promotions such as All Star Wrestling, working regular shows at Butlins holiday parks after throwing out an open challenge to potential rivals for his Pan Pacific and GSA heavyweight titles. He has also toured Wales for both Orig Williams and Alan Ravenhill.

During his time in the now defunct Frontier Wrestling Alliance he wrestled for the FWA British Heavyweight Championship in a five-way match at The Champions Series Final on January 5, 2006, in Hoddesdon, Hertfordshire, England, but was defeated by Hade Vansen.

Hitchen also has wrestled in many other countries around the continent, countries such as Denmark, Poland, Italy, France, Portugal, Austria, Russia, Switzerland, Netherlands, Belgium and Greece. Overall, he wrestled in more than 24 countries around the world.

In 2014, in February he lost to David Hart Smith in a DWA/PWF match in Germany. Then he lost to Andrei Ivanov in Pro Wrestling Showdown in the Netherlands. In March he lost to Wolfgang in Premier British Wrestling. In April and May he competed in German organizations Deutsche Wrestling Allianz, German Hurricane Wrestling, Westside Xtreme Wrestling and Power of Wrestling.

World Wrestling Federation (2000–2001)
After a few try-out matches, Joe got signed in early 2000. He made his TV debut on the July 2, 2000 episode of Heat. He competed as Just Joe in the WWF before he was released from his contract in March 2001. When he was in the WWF, his gimmick was that of a messenger who tried to stir the pot.

Touring the United States (2003–2004)
During his time in the United States, Hitchen competed in the Puerto Rican International Wrestling Association under the ring name Nord. On March 8, 2003, he captured the IWA Intercontinental Heavyweight Championship by defeating Glamour Boy Shane in Toa Baja, Puerto Rico. He lost the championship to Chicano in Bayamón, Puerto Rico on April 19 the same year.

He returned to America in 2004 to compete in the Nashville, Tennessee-based Total Nonstop Action Wrestling. During his time in TNA as part of the Red Shirt Security, he won the NWA World Tag Team Championship with Kevin Northcutt. They held the belts from January 28, 2004 to February 4 of the same year.

Russian and Japanese promotions (2006–2010)
Hitchen made his debut in Russia as he competed at Independent Wrestling Federation's Wrestliada 2006 in Moscow, Russia, under the ring name Joe Legend. At the July 28, 2007 event he defeated Volcano to become the first IWF World Champion. During his reign he defeated Raven to retain the championship.

In August 2006, he worked for Pro Wrestling NOAH on their Shiny Navigation Tour, and in April 2007, he worked on the Spring Navigation tour. From July to September 2010, he toured with Pro Wrestling Zero1 working the likes of Masato Tanaka, Shinjiro Otani, Ikuto Hidaka, and Sylvester Terkay.

World Wrestling Professionals (2007–2014)

Joe E. Legend tours annually with World Wrestling Professionals (WWP), a South African promotion currently airing on a nationally broadcast network. He also acts as their scouting agent, having been responsible for bringing Mikey Whiplash, Angelico and Murat over to WWP. Joe Legend worked for WWP in 2007 and 2008 and returned in 2009.
The January 10, 2009 episode of WWP saw Joe Legend defeat PJ Black (better known as Justin Gabriel) to capture the then vacant WWP Heavyweight World Title for the first time.
His most recent appearance for WWP was on a tour of Nigeria in August 2014, where he interfered in Tornado's match, causing him to lose to Nigerian wrestler De Ultimate Commander.

Pro Wrestling Showdown (2017)
Joe Legend came back 25 November 2017 (Showdown 33), defeating Alexander James in a match for a spot in the Pro Wrestling Showdown World Cup.

Unlimited Wrestling (2019)
Joe Legend joined the German based company Unlimited Wrestling in 2019, where he mostly competes in the most important matches on the card.

Other media
In December 2007, Joe E. Legend became the co-host of The Main Event Radio, the official podcast of TotalWrestling.net.

In May 2009, Hitchen was announced as one of the competitors on the Turkish version of Gladiators, which began filming in September 2009.

Joe E Legend has also acted in several films in France and the UK as well as taking the role of "fight choreographer" for these features. Joe is represented by Jessica Soss of V.S Films and is actively pursuing further roles in film and TV.

Personal life
Hitchen is good friends with fellow professional wrestlers Terry Gerin, Don Callis, Jay Reso, and Adam Copeland. He and his wife, Svenia Hitchen, have twin boys named Connor and Maverick.

Published works

Hitchen is the co-author of Marie's World, published in June 2014 by Austin Macauley Publishers.

Championships and accomplishments

Association Biterroise de Catch
ABC Ultimate Championship (1 time)
Asylum Of Wrestling Maniacs
AWM Heavyweight Championship (1 time)
Athletik Club Wrestling
ACW Heavyweight Championship (1 time)
Atlantic Grand Prix Wrestling
AGPW Continental Championship (1 time)
Catch Wrestling Association
CWA World Tag Team Championship (1 time) - with Rhino Richards
Deutsche Wrestling Allianz
DWA World Heavyweight Championship (1 time) 
Do or Die Wrestling
DDW International Championship (1 time)
Flemish Wrestling Force
FWF Tag Team Championship (1 time) - with Jerry Sags 
German Stampede Wrestling
GSW Heavyweight Championship (1 time)
German Wrestling Promotion
GWP World Championship (1 time)
GWP WrestlingCorner.de Championship (1 time)
Herts And Essex Wrestling
HEW Heavyweight Championship (2 times, currant)
Insane Championship Wrestling
ICW/MWCW Mid-West Unified Tag Team Championship (1 time) - with Sexton Hardcastle
ICW Brass Knuckles Championship (1 time)
International Wrestling Association
IWA Intercontinental Heavyweight Championship (1 time) 
IWA Television Championship (1 time)
Independent Wrestling Federation (Russia)
IWF World Championship (1 time)
International Catch Wrestling Alliance
ICWA World Heavyweight Championship (1 time)
LDN Wrestling
LDN British Heavyweight Championship (1 time)
Outlaw Championship Wrestling
OCW Tag Team Championship (1 time) - with Sexton Hardcastle
Pennsylvania Championship Wrestling
PCW America's Heavyweight Championship (1 time)
Giorgio Foods Tag Team Tournament (1999) - with Jason Lee
Power of Wrestling
POW Intercontinental Championship (1 time)
Pro Wrestling Fighters
PWF Buckhorn Wrestling Cup (2009)
Power Wrestling Entertainment
PWE World Championship (1 time)
Pro Wrestling Illustrated
PWI ranked him #140 of the top 500 singles wrestlers in the PWI 500 in 2009
Pro Wrestling Showdown
PWS Heavyweight Championship (1 time)
Pro Wrestling Xtreme
PWX Heavyweight Championship (1 time)
Pan Pacific Wrestling Association
Pan Pacific Heavyweight Championship (1 time)
Scottish School Of Wrestling
SSW Hardcore Championship (1 time)
Swiss Wrestling Federation
SWF Powerhouse Championship (1 time)
Total Nonstop Action Wrestling
NWA World Tag Team Championship (1 time)  - with Kevin Northcutt
World Wide Wrestling League
W3L Heavyweight Championship (1 time)
World Wrestling Professionals
WWP World Heavyweight Championship (1 time)
World Wrestling Superstars
WWS Heavyweight Championship (1 time)
Wrestling-Family-Germany Promotion
WFG Championship (1 time)
YAWARA
YAWARA Championship (1 time)
Other titles
IMP Tag Team Championship (1 time)
GPW Continental Championship (2 times)
PPW World Super-Heavyweight Championship (1time)

References

External links
 LegendWrestling.com - the official website of Legend
 The Main Event on Wrestling-Radio - Co-Host Joe E. Legend
 Official Facebook
 

1969 births
20th-century professional wrestlers
21st-century professional wrestlers
Canadian male professional wrestlers
Living people
Professional wrestlers from Toronto
NWA World Tag Team Champions